Barry Faulkner (full name: Francis Barrett Faulkner; July 12, 1881 – October 27, 1966) was an American artist primarily known for his murals. During World War I, he and sculptor Sherry Edmundson Fry organized artists for training as camouflage specialists (called camoufleurs), an effort that contributed to the founding of the American Camouflage Corps in 1917.

Background

Faulkner was born in Keene, New Hampshire. He was a cousin of the painter and naturalist Abbott H. Thayer (sometimes called the “father of camouflage”), who lived in nearby Dublin (White 1951). He was a student of Thayer, George de Forest Brush and Augustus Saint-Gaudens. Discouraged by his family from pursuing a career in art, he agreed to attend one year at Harvard University, where his roommate was Saint-Gaudens’ son, Homer Saint-Gaudens. He then returned to the study of art and, in 1907, won the Rome Prize for travel in Europe and study at the American Academy in Rome.

Faulkner returned to the U.S. in 1910, and thereafter worked as a muralist from his studio in New York City (Faulkner 1973). In 1926, he was elected into the National Academy of Design as an Associate member, and became a full Academician in 1931. He continued to serve as a trustee and active member of the American Academy and in 1960 received a Rome Medal for outstanding service.

Camouflage contributions
With the outbreak of World War I, he and other New York artists anticipated the U.S. entry in the war. With Sherry Fry (who had also studied with Augustus Saint-Gaudens), he organized dozens of artists in a civilian pre-war unit called the New York Camouflage Society. After the U.S. entered the war, the U.S. Army formed its own unit, called the American Camouflage Corps, with Captain Homer Saint-Gaudens as its commanding officer (Behrens 2002; 2009, pp. 24–25). According to Faulkner’s autobiography, he and Fry, with four other artists (Laurence Grant, Henry Sutter, Harry Thrasher and “Casey” Jones), were the first enlisted camoufleurs. He spent the remainder of the war in France, attached to what was officially called Company A of the 40th Engineers (Faulkner 1973).

Murals
Throughout his life, Faulkner's main achievements were as a muralist. His earliest commissions (beginning in 1907) were for murals in the homes of prominent families (Rumrill 2007). These led in turn to commissions for murals or mosaics for (among others):

 Washington Irving High School, New York City, 1916–19
 The Cunard Building, New York City
 Eastman Theatre, Rochester, New York, 1922
 Metropolitan Life Insurance Company, Ottawa, Ontario, Canada, 1927 (now the Canadian Parliament Wellington Building)
 University of Illinois Library, Urbana, Illinois, 1928
 Mortensen Hall at Bushnell Center, Hartford, Connecticut, 1931
 RCA Building, Rockefeller Center, New York City, 1933
 Phillips Academy Andover, Andover, Massachusetts, 1934
 National Archives Building (Rotunda of the Charters of Freedom), Washington, D.C., 1936
 Oregon State Capitol, Salem, Oregon, 1938, including a panel in the House chamber behind the Speaker's desk that depicts the 1843 meeting at Champoeg when Oregon formed a provisional government
 Senate Chamber, New Hampshire State Capitol, Concord (including a panel depicting Abbott H. Thayer and his followers), 1942
 John Hancock Building, Boston, 1949
 Keene National Bank (now Bank of America), Keene, New Hampshire, 1950
 Cheshire County Savings Bank, Keene, New Hampshire, 1955 (now at the Historical Society of Cheshire County)

The center panel of the ceiling in Mortensen Hall is the largest hand-painted ceiling mural in the United States. The work, entitled Drama, is based on Greek motifs although it is an ode to American progress in the early 20th century, including aviation, architecture, cinema and dramatic arts. The mural cost $50,000 in 1929.

Several murals in the large foyer of the Washington Irving High School auditorium depict scenes from New York state history.

In 2007, the Historical Society of Cheshire County produced a full-color book about Faulkner's achievements as a muralist, with audio recordings of the artist talking about his life (Rumrill 2007).

References

Bibliography

 Behrens, Roy R. (2002), False Colors: Art, Design and Modern Camouflage. Dysart, Iowa: Bobolink Books. .
 ___ (2009), Camoupedia: A Compendium of Research on Art, Architecture and Camouflage. Dysart, Iowa: Bobolink Books. .
 Faulkner, Barry (1973), Sketches from an Artist’s Life. Dublin, New Hampshire: William Bauhan. .
 Rumrill, Alan F., and Carl B. Jacobs, Jr. (2007), Steps to Great Art: Barry Faulkner and the Art of the Muralist. Keene, New Hampshire: Historical Society of Cheshire County. .
 White, Nelson C. (1951), Abbott H. Thayer: Painter and Naturalist. Hartford, Connecticut: Connecticut Printers.
  (1999), "The Faulkner Murals: The Barry Faulkner Murals at Washington Irving High School, History, Conservation, and Education". New York: Municipal Art Society of New York.

External links

 Art and camouflage
 Barry Faulkner papers at the Archives of American Art

20th-century American painters
American male painters
American muralists
1881 births
1966 deaths
Harvard University alumni
People from Keene, New Hampshire
Artists from New Hampshire
20th-century American male artists
Members of the American Academy of Arts and Letters